Near future is future which is relatively near.

Near future or  Near Future may also refer to:
 Near future (grammar), a grammatical tense
 Timeline of the near future, planned and predicted near future events
 Near future in fiction
 "The Near Future", a 1919 song by Irving Berlin
 The Near Future (film), a 2012 Canadian short drama film directed by Sophie Goyette 
 The Near Future (album), a 2014 album by I Fight Dragons

See also